Tuzu may refer to:
 Monguor people
 Tuzu, Iran